William L. Courtright (born December 1, 1957) is an American politician and the former mayor of Scranton, Pennsylvania. He was elected on November 5, 2013, defeating Republican Jim Mulligan, 55%–45%. He was re-elected on November 7, 2017, again defeating Republican nominee, Jim Mulligan, 52%–48%. In October 2020 he was sentenced to 7 years imprisonment on corruption charges.

Political career
Courtright served on the Scranton City Council for six years. He was elected Scranton Tax Collector on November 3, 2009, and served a four-year term.

Courtright was first elected mayor of Scranton, Pennsylvania, in 2013.

Personal life
Courtright and his wife, Kim, have three children, William, Jr., Patrick, and Lindsey. 

FBI agents raided his home on January 9, 2019. The FBI did not immediately disclose what crimes Bill Courtright was suspected of committing.

Courtright pleaded guilty on July 2, 2020, to charges of conspiracy, bribery and extortion. On October 2, 2020, he was sentenced to 7 years imprisonment and ordered to pay a $25,000 fine.

Electoral history

References

1957 births
Living people
Mayors of Scranton, Pennsylvania
Pennsylvania Democrats
Pennsylvania politicians convicted of crimes
Pennsylvania politicians convicted of corruption
Prisoners and detainees of the United States federal government